The  Cak is a stringed musical instrument from Indonesia. It has four strings in three courses. It is tuned D5 D5, F#4, B4. The strings are made of steel.

The instrument evolved from a small banjo, but now has a wooden front and a guitar-shaped body. The body is usually hollowed out of a solid piece of wood. The soundboard has many little soundholes arranged in a geometric pattern. It is mainly used to play Keroncong music along with the Cuk.

References

External links
 Stringed Instrument Database
 ATLAS of Plucked Instruments

String instruments
Indonesian musical instruments